The Slim family is a Mexican family of Lebanese descent whose members reside in Europe, Lebanon, the United States and Mexico. The family is currently one of the wealthiest in the world.

Notable members
Carlos Slim Helú (born 1940), business magnate, considered the wealthiest person in the world for several years.
Carlos Slim Domit (born 1967), business magnate.

References

 
Mexican business families
Lebanese families
Telecommunications company families